Ivan Kiryakov (born 5 July 1943) is a Bulgarian boxer. He competed in the men's welterweight event at the 1968 Summer Olympics. At the 1968 Summer Olympics, he defeated Bohumil Němeček of Czechoslovakia, before losing to Celal Sandal of Turkey.

References

1943 births
Living people
Bulgarian male boxers
Olympic boxers of Bulgaria
Boxers at the 1968 Summer Olympics
Welterweight boxers
20th-century Bulgarian people